Elections to Local Bodies in Tamil Nadu are conducted once in five years to elect the representatives to the Urban and Rural local bodies. These elections are conducted by Tamil Nadu State Election Commission

Local Bodies in Tamil Nadu

Urban local bodies include 21 Municipal corporations, 148 Municipalities and 561 Town panchayats. 

Rural local bodies include 12,620 Village Panchayats, 385 Panchayat Unions, and 37 District Panchayats.

Previous elections
The first election to the local bodies in Tamil Nadu were held in October 1996. Subsequent elections were conducted in October 2001 and October 2006. Recent elections to Local bodies were held in two phases in the month of October 2011 - 17 October 2011 and 19 October 2011.

2011 elections

2019 Election

Urban Local body elections and elections for the newly formed 9 districts were not held due to pandemic situation.

See also
Tamil Nadu State Election Commission

References

External links
 Govt. of Tamil Nadu Official site
 Tamil Nadu State Election Commission Official Site

Elections in Tamil Nadu
Elections
Tamil Nadu